HMS Monarch was a 74-gun third rate ship of the line of the Royal Navy, built by Adam Hayes and launched on 20 July 1765 at Deptford Dockyard.

Service History

This huge ship had a complement of 550 men as crew, and had many distinguished commanders.

Monarch had a very active career, fighting in her first battle in 1778 at the First Battle of Ushant and her second under Admiral Rodney at Cape St. Vincent in 1780. She fought in the van of Graves' fleet at the Battle of the Chesapeake in 1781 under Admiral Francis Reynolds. In early 1782 she was actively engaged at the Capture of Sint Eustatius, Action of 4 February 1781, the Battle of Saint Kitts, the Battle of the Saintes and, the Battle of the Mona Passage.

Monarch was at Plymouth on 20 January 1795 and so shared in the proceeds of the detention of the Dutch naval vessels, East Indiamen, and other merchant vessels that were in port on the outbreak of war between Britain and the Netherlands.

Later in 1795 she was part of the small fleet under Admiral George Elphinstone that captured the Cape of Good Hope from the Dutch East India Company at the Battle of Muizenberg.

In 1797 Monarch was Vice Admiral Richard Onslow's flagship at the Battle of Camperdown, under Captain Edward O'Bryen

In 1801 Monarch was part of Admiral Nelson's fleet at the Battle of Copenhagen, where her captain, James Robert Mosse was killed early in the action and replaced by Lieutenant John Yelland, the next highest ranking officer. Monarch suffered over 200 casualties including 55 dead, the highest number of casualties of any ship engaged in the battle.

In 1807, Monarch helped escort the Portuguese royal family in its flight from Portugal to Brazil.

Monarch was broken up in 1813.

See also
 Fourth Anglo-Dutch War

Notes

References

Lavery, Brian (2003) The Ship of the Line - Volume 1: The development of the battlefleet 1650-1850. Conway Maritime Press. .

External links
 

Ships of the line of the Royal Navy
Ramillies-class ships of the line
Ships built in Deptford
1765 ships